Guðný Árnadóttir (born 4 August 2000) is an Icelandic professional footballer who plays as a left back for Italian Serie A club AC Milan and the Iceland women's national team. In 2019, she won the Icelandic championship with Valur.

References

External links

2000 births
Living people
Guðný Árnadóttir
Women's association football defenders
Guðný Árnadóttir
Guðný Árnadóttir
Guðný Árnadóttir
Guðný Árnadóttir
Expatriate women's footballers in Italy
Icelandic expatriate footballers
Icelandic expatriate sportspeople in Italy
Serie A (women's football) players
A.C. Milan Women players
S.S.D. Napoli Femminile players
UEFA Women's Euro 2022 players